A list of films produced in Japan ordered by year in the 1980s.  For an A-Z of films see :Category:Japanese films.

1980
Japanese films of 1980

1981
Japanese films of 1981

1982
Japanese films of 1982

1983
Japanese films of 1983

1984
Japanese films of 1984

1985
Japanese films of 1985

1986
Japanese films of 1986

1987
Japanese films of 1987

1988
Japanese films of 1988

1989
Japanese films of 1989

External links
 Japanese film at the Internet Movie Database

1980s
Japanese
Films